Chuniespoort (recently Chuenespoort) is a mountain pass situated in the Limpopo Province, on the R37, the road between Polokwane and Lebowakgomo, South Africa. The river flowing through this gorge of the Strydpoort Mountains is known as the Chunies River, one of the tributaries of the Olifants River.

Etymology
The pass is named for an African leader, whose name would be spelled Tshwene in modern Northern Sotho orthography.

References

Populated places in the Polokwane Local Municipality
Mountain passes of Limpopo